Nemanja Jorgić (born 7 April 1988) is a Serbian professional footballer who plays as a goalkeeper for TSC Bačka Topola.

Club career
After progressing through the youth setup of Vojvodina, Jorgić was loaned out to Serbian League Vojvodina club Sloga Temerin. He later played for Spartak Subotica, making one appearance in the 2010–11 UEFA Europa League.

In early 2015, Jorgić moved to Bačka Zone League side TSC Bačka Topola. He helped the club win promotion to the Serbian League Vojvodina in 2015, then to the Serbian First League in 2017, and eventually to the Serbian SuperLiga in 2019.

International career
Jorgić was capped for Serbia and Montenegro U17.

Honours
TSC Bačka Topola
 Serbian First League: 2018–19

Notes

References

External links
 
 
 

Association football goalkeepers
FK Cement Beočin players
FK Palić players
FK Radnički Sombor players
FK Sloga Temerin players
FK Spartak Subotica players
FK TSC Bačka Topola players
FK Vojvodina players
Serbia and Montenegro footballers
Serbian First League players
Serbian footballers
Serbian SuperLiga players
Serbs of Croatia
Sportspeople from Virovitica
1988 births
Living people